State Street Bank Building, also known as 225 Franklin Street, is a high-rise office building located in the Financial District, Boston, Massachusetts. It is tied with 33 Arch Street as the 20th-tallest building in Boston. The architectural firm who designed the building was F.A. Stahl & Associates. State Street Bank Building was one of the first skyscrapers to be built in Boston after the completion of the Prudential Tower in 1964. The building gained its name from the prominent "State Street Bank" lettering present at the top of the building for many years, although the sign has since been taken down. A similar "State Street" sign was subsequently placed at One Lincoln Street.

In 2009, Fish & Richardson agreed to lease space in One Marina Park in South Boston as its new headquarters and abandon its current headquarters at the State Street Bank Building. It will move beginning in the third quarter of 2010.

See also
List of tallest buildings in Boston

References

External links
225 Franklin Street
Entry on Emporis
Entry on SkyscraperPage
Fish & Richardson to occupy 124,000 sf at 1 Marina Park Drive

Skyscraper office buildings in Boston
Bank buildings in Boston
Office buildings completed in 1966